List of Abunas may refer to:

List of Abunas of Ethiopia
List of Abunas of Eritrea